Nicholas Craig Stovold (born 8 June 1981) is an English cricketer.  Stovold is a right-handed batsman.  He was born in Bristol.

Stovold represented the Gloucestershire Cricket Board in List A cricket.  His debut List A match came against the Nottinghamshire Cricket Board in the 2000 NatWest Trophy.  From 2000 to 2001, he represented the Board in 5 List A matches, the last of which came against the Yorkshire Cricket Board in the 2nd round of the 2002 Cheltenham & Gloucester Trophy which was played in 2001.  In his 5 List A matches, he scored 86 runs at a batting average of 17.20, with a high score of 33.  In the field he took 2 catches.

In 2002 he made his Minor Counties Championship debut for Shropshire against Wiltshire.  He represented the county in 2 further Championship matches, which came against Dorset in 2002 and Devon in 2003.  Stolvold played a single MCCA Knockout Trophy match for the county in 2002 against Staffordshire.

Family
His father, Andy, played first-class cricket for Gloucestershire, Orange Free State and the Marylebone Cricket Club.  His uncle, Martin, played first-class cricket for Gloucestershire.  His brother, Neil, also played List A cricket for the Gloucestershire Cricket Board.

References

External links
Nicholas Stovold at Cricinfo
Nicholas Stovold at CricketArchive

1981 births
Living people
Cricketers from Bristol
English cricketers
Gloucestershire Cricket Board cricketers
Shropshire cricketers